The Long Days of Summer is a 1980 American made-for-television drama film and a sequel to When Every Day Was the Fourth of July (1978). Taking place one year later, the story follows now 13-year-old Danny (Ronnie Scribner, taking over the role played Chris Peterson in the 1978 film) and the Cooper family in 1938, as they begin to experience the effects of growing antisemitism in their small New England town, parallelling what is happening overseas in Hitler's Germany.  The film was produced and directed by Dan Curtis and stars Dean Jones, Donald Moffat, Ronnie Scribner and Louanne.

Plot
In the summer of 1938 in Bridgeport, Connecticut, Jewish 13-year-old, Daniel Cooper finds himself tangling with the bigoted playground bully, Freddy Landauer. As the talk of Bridgeport centers around the pending rematch between boxing heavyweight champ Joe Louis and his German challenger Max Schmeling, Danny is challenged to a boxing match with the Landauer boy, to which he feels he has no choice but to accept.  Paralleling his plight, Danny's father, Ed, also begins to experience antisemitism when he takes in a Jewish boarder from Germany, Josef, who has come to the United States to warn of the increasing menace overseas in the form of Adolf Hitler. As Danny and his family are faced with their own pressures from within their small-town community, they must each make difficult decisions about standing up for what is right in the face of discrimination and intimidation.

Cast

Production
When Every Day Was the Fourth of July originally aired on the NBC network and was intended to be a pilot for a potential series.  However, when the series was not picked up, Curtis made The Long Days of Summer as a sequel, but this time airing on the ABC network instead.
  
Although a few of the original actors did return to reprise their roles, including Tiger Williams and Gloria Calomee, Dean Jones was the only lead to reprise his role, with the rest of the Cooper family portrayed by different actors for the sequel.  Veteran film and television actor, Charles Aidman also returned to narrate as the voice of adult Danny, but was uncredited in both films.  Child actress Louanne was cast to take over the role of Sarah for the sequel, becoming her very first role before rising to stardom in such films as Oh, God! Book II and A Night in the Life of Jimmy Reardon.

As with the first film, the decision was made to shoot "Bridgeport, Connecticut" in California.  Curtis returned to the same neighborhood in Echo Park, Los Angeles, and shot many of the outdoor scenes for the sequel in the same locations that were used in the original film.

Awards

See also
When Every Day Was the Fourth of July

References

External links

1980 television films
1980 films
1980 drama films
Television sequel films
Films set in Connecticut
Films set in 1938
Films directed by Dan Curtis
Films shot in Los Angeles
American drama television films
1980s English-language films
1980s American films